The Saudi Second Division is the Third level football competition in Saudi Arabia. Qualified three teams to Saudi First Division.

Location: is the site of the club and not the site of the stadium

Final league table

Third place match

Final

External links 
 Saudi Arabia Football Federation 
 Saudi League Statistics
 goalzz

Saudi Second Division seasons
2012–13 in Saudi Arabian football